Joël Cantona (born 26 October 1967) is a French former professional footballer who played as a defender. He is the younger brother of Eric Cantona. Since retiring he has had some minor acting roles.

References

External links
 Stats
 

1967 births
Living people
Association football defenders
French footballers
French expatriate footballers
Olympique de Marseille players
Stade Rennais F.C. players
Royal Antwerp F.C. players
Angers SCO players
CS Meaux players
Újpest FC players
Peterborough United F.C. players
Stockport County F.C. players
Ligue 1 players
Ligue 2 players
Nemzeti Bajnokság I players
French beach soccer players
French male film actors
French sportspeople of Italian descent
French people of Spanish descent
French people of Catalan descent
Expatriate footballers in Belgium
Expatriate footballers in England
Expatriate footballers in Hungary
Male actors from Budapest
French people of Sardinian descent